, also known by the stage name NU-KO, is a Japanese singer and voice actress affiliated with Swallow. Beginning her activities as a dōjin (self-published) musician in 2012, she began voice acting activities in 2018. She is known for her roles as King Halo in Uma Musume Pretty Derby, Kimie "Tanpopo" Kamata in Oresuki, Vanilla in Nekopara, Ashley in Lapis Re:Lights, and Yashiro Chikama in Adachi and Shimamura.

Biography
Saeki was born in Kanagawa Prefecture on July 22, 1994. She grew up in a family that was fond of playing video games such as a fighting game in the Saint Seiya series. While in elementary school, she became interested in anime after watching the series Neon Genesis Evangelion and developing a fondness for the character Shinji Ikari and his voice actor Megumi Ogata. She also became a fan of Nana Mizuki, and was impressed by how Mizuki was able to find success both as a singer and as a voice actress. Although she initially wanted to pursue a career in voice acting, she decided to start out as a singer instead.

In 2012, Saeki learned of an audition to perform songs for the arcade game series Pop'n Music. Under the name NU-KO, she applied for the audition, and after passing, performed the song  for the series. She would also release several more dōjin songs under the NU-KO alias.

In 2017, Saeki decided to start a voice acting career, and trained at a school run by the talent agency Swallow. After finishing her training, she became affiliated with Swallow in 2018 and made her voice acting debut as a maid in the anime television series Ms. Koizumi Loves Ramen Noodles. She was then cast as King Halo in the multimedia franchise Uma Musume Pretty Derby. Later that year, she was cast as the characters Maiko Kurashiki in the mobile game Hachigatsu no Cinderella Nine and Mitsuki Gero in the mixed-media project Onsen Musume, replacing Yurika Endō who had announced her retirement from voice acting. In 2019, she reprised the role of Maiko for the anime television series adaptation of Hachigatsu no Cinderella Nine, and played the role of Kimie "Tanpopo" Kamata in Oresuki. In 2020, she played the role of Vanilla in Nekopara, played the role of Kozue Kasugai in Rebirth, reprised the role of Ashley for the anime television series adaptation of Lapis Re:Lights, and played the role of Yashiro Chikama in Adachi and Shimamura.  In 2021, she played the role of Kei Ayamine in Muv-Luv Alternative.  In 2022, she played the role of Menou in The Executioner and Her Way of Life, and played the role of Moe Yanagida in Tokyo Mew Mew New.

Filmography

Anime
2018
Ms. Koizumi Loves Ramen Noodles as Maid
Uma Musume Pretty Derby as King Halo
Revue Starlight as Hinano Kyōmoto (episode 1), Marina Banbaen (episode 2), Classmate, Child, Costume B

2019
Hachigatsu no Cinderella Nine as Maiko Kurashiki
Gifu no Taketayo as Gero Kaeru Noyatarou
Z/X Code reunion as Honome Chōgasaki
Oresuki as Kimie "Tampopo" Kamata

2020
Nekopara as Vanilla
Rebirth as Kozue Kasugai
Lapis Re:Lights as Ashley
Muhyo & Roji's Bureau of Supernatural Investigation Season 2 as Boy
Umayon as King Halo
Adachi and Shimamura as Yashiro Chikama
Assault Lily Bouquet as Hiromu Sejima

2021
The Quintessential Quintuplets ∬ as Tsubaki
SSSS.Dynazenon as Kano Minami
Fairy Ranmaru as Schoolgirl 2, Fan 2, Idol B, Schoolchild, Tina Musuko
Blue Reflection Ray as Yukiko Takaoka
Dragon Goes House-Hunting as Receptionist
How a Realist Hero Rebuilt the Kingdom as Julia
Muv-Luv Alternative as Kei Ayamine

2022
Akebi's Sailor Uniform as Mika
Cue! as Recording Assistant
The Executioner and Her Way of Life as Menou
Tokyo Mew Mew New as Moe Yanagida

2023
The Iceblade Sorcerer Shall Rule the World as Amelia Rose
The Tale of the Outcasts as Vivian

Video games
2015
Otocadoll as Nyandora

2018
Hachigatsu no Cinderella Nine as Maiko Kurashiki
Gothic wa Mahou Otome as Mitoca
Shōjo Kageki Revue Starlight -Re LIVE- as Yuyuko Tanaka
Megido 72 as Baphomet

2021
Uma Musume Pretty Derby as King Halo

2022
GrimGrimoire OnceMore as Lillet Blan

TBA
Lapis Re:Lights as Ashley

References

External links
Official agency profile 

1994 births
Living people
Japanese video game actresses
Japanese voice actresses
Musicians from Kanagawa Prefecture
Voice actresses from Kanagawa Prefecture
21st-century Japanese actresses
21st-century Japanese singers
21st-century Japanese women singers